Óscar Miguel Pitillas (born 16 October 1971) is a Spanish hurdler. He competed in the men's 400 metres hurdles at the 1996 Summer Olympics.

References

1971 births
Living people
Athletes (track and field) at the 1996 Summer Olympics
Spanish male hurdlers
Olympic athletes of Spain
Place of birth missing (living people)